Pierre Dupuis or Pierre Dupuys (3 March 1610 in Montfort-l'Amaury – 18 February 1682 in Paris) was a French painter.

He lived in Italy, where he met Pierre Mignard (1612–1695) in 1637. He was a specialist of still lifes and his style was influenced by Northern Europe painting and Protestant religion. In his paintings of bouquets, an influence of Jacques Linard (1600–1645) and Louise Moillon (1610–1696). These paintings were very appreciated in his times.

Further reading
Coatalem E., A still-life painter: PIERRE DUPUIS, The stamp. The art object, 1999, No. 335, pp. 48–55, (in French), ISSN 0998-8041, Editions Faton, Dijon, France (1989) (Revue), at INIST-CNRS, Cote INIST: 25659, 35400008348741.0030.

1610 births
1682 deaths
17th-century French painters
French male painters